The 1913–14 Duquesne Dukes men's basketball team represents Duquesne University during the 1913–14 college men's basketball season. The head coach was Alexander Hogarty coaching the Dukes in his first season. The team had finished the season with an overall record of 7–2.

Schedule

|-

References

Duquesne Dukes men's basketball seasons
Duquesne